Osman Musayevich Kasayev (11 October 1916 – 18 February 1944) was a Karachay Major in the Soviet Army during World War II who commanded a partisan detachment after his artillery division was defeated by the Germans during Operation Barbarossa. His detachment eventually became the 121st Partisan Regiment, and under his command the unit was credited with resulting the deaths of over 1,000 German soldiers before he died of injuries from an airstrike in 1944. In 1965, on the 20th anniversary of the end of the war, he was posthumously awarded the title Hero of the Soviet Union.

References

1916 births
1944 deaths
Heroes of the Soviet Union
Recipients of the Order of Lenin
Soviet partisans
Belarusian partisans
Soviet military personnel killed in World War II
Deaths by airstrike during World War II